Lyudmyla Heorhiyivna Ivanova, married surname: Tkachenko, (born 2 December 1978) is a Ukrainian former competitive figure skater. She began appearing in senior internationals at age 14. She placed 15th at the 1994 European Championships and then represented Ukraine at the 1994 Winter Olympics, finishing 22nd. Ivanova also continued to compete on the junior level and placed tenth at the 1996 World Junior Championships. After coaching in Mariupol, she relocated to Mykolaiv in 2014.

Competitive highlights

References 

1978 births
Ukrainian female single skaters
Living people
Olympic figure skaters of Ukraine
Figure skaters at the 1994 Winter Olympics